Taito may refer to:
 Taito, a Japanese developer of video game software and arcade hardware
 Taito of Brazil, a former Brazilian subsidiary for pinball machines
 Taitō, a special ward located in Tokyo, Japan
 Taito, also known as matai, paramount chiefs according to Fa'a Samoa
 Taitō Prefecture, administrative division of Taiwan under Japanese rule (now called Taitung County)
 Taitung City, formerly Taitō City, the capital of the administrative division
 Taito (kanji), the 84-stroke Japanese character 
 Taitō Station, a railway station in Japan
 Taito (harvestman), a genus of harvestmen in the family Cosmetidae

See also
 Tayto (disambiguation)